Valentin Popârlan (born 12 June 1987) is a Romanian rugby union player. He plays in the lock and occasionally flanker position for professional SuperLiga club Timișoara and București based European Challenge Cup side the Wolves. Popârlan also plays for Romania's national team the Oaks.

Popârlan made his international debut in 2007 as a substitute against Namibia. He played for Romania in the IRB Nations Cup and in their 2011 Rugby World Cup qualifying before appearing for them in the 2011 Rugby World Cup. He played four Tests at the World Cup, three as a substitute against Scotland, Argentina and Georgia and one in number four lock position against England.

References

External links

 Valentin Popârlan at Timișoara Saracens website

1987 births
Romanian rugby union players
Romania international rugby union players
București Wolves players
CSA Steaua București (rugby union) players 
SCM Rugby Timișoara players
Rugby union locks
Living people